Vilson Pedro Kleinübing (9 September 1944 - 23 October 1998) was a Brazilian politician who served as Governor of Santa Catarina from 1991 until 1994.

Biography

Early life
Born in Montenegro, Rio Grande do Sul, his family later moved to Videira, where his father Waldemar Kleinübing would serve as mayor from 1966 until 1970. He held a mechanical engineering degree from the Federal University of Rio Grande do Sul (1968) and an economic engineering degree from the Federal University of Santa Catarina (1970).

In 1970 he became a member of Celesc and for six years was manager of the Distribution Department. He taught at the business and management school of Santa Catarina State University for eight years.

He served as a Federal Deputy from 1983 to 1987, Secretary of Agriculture and Supply of Santa Catarina, and Mayor of Blumenau from 1989 to 1990, the latter office of which he resigned from to run for Governor of Santa Catarina, which he won in 1991.

Kleinübing's administration saw a reduction of the cabinet from twenty-three to ten, the number of civil job positions being severed in half; and decreasing popularity stemming from the pay cuts that earned him the nickname of "mau patrão" (which is Portuguese for "bad boss") from his civil employees. He resigned from the office to take his seat in the Senate, where he would remain until his death.

Death
Kleinübing died at the age of 54 on 23 October 1998 of lung cancer in Florianópolis. , his first alternate who had been elected in 1990, completed his term in the Federal Senate. Vice President Marco Maciel attended the funeral as the president's representative.

Personal life
He was a close friend of Esperidião Amin, and he helped with Amin's unsuccessful 1978 Federal Deputy campaign.

His son is João Paulo Kleinübing.

References

1944 births
1998 deaths
Governors of Santa Catarina (state)
Members of the Federal Senate (Brazil)
Members of the Chamber of Deputies (Brazil) from Santa Catarina
Mayors of places in Brazil
People from Blumenau
People from Rio Grande do Sul
Federal University of Rio Grande do Sul alumni
Federal University of Santa Catarina alumni
Brazilian people of German descent
Deaths from lung cancer